Bonaire is an unincorporated community in Houston County in the U.S. state of Georgia. Bonaire is located on and around U.S. Route 129, which is connected to Interstate 75 by Georgia State Route 96, As of 2021, SR 96 bypass Bonaire. Bonaire is the hometown of former state Governor and 31st United States Secretary of Agriculture Sonny Perdue.

History
The inhabitants of the area formed Bonaire around the newly laid Georgia Southern & Florida railway when it came through in 1888. Newspaper records in 1888 uniformly spell it without the final "e", but in 1889 the modern spelling began to be used (perhaps because the post office was registered with that spelling on Dec 3, 1888). The name is reputedly of French origin, meaning "good air". The Georgia General Assembly incorporated Bonaire in 1912. The town's charter was dissolved in 1995.
On April 5, 2022, the town was heavily damaged by a high-end EF3 tornado, which damaged or destroyed multiple homes and knocked down trees, power poles, and power lines. One person was injured.

Education

Elementary
Bonaire Elementary School
Bonaire Primary School
Hilltop Elementary School
Also served by:
David A Purdue Elementary School
David A Purdue Primary School
Russell Elementary School

Middle schools
Bonaire Middle School
Also served by:
Huntington Middle School

High schools
Served by:
Veterans High School
Warner Robins High School

References

Former municipalities in Georgia (U.S. state)
Unincorporated communities in Houston County, Georgia
Unincorporated communities in Georgia (U.S. state)
Populated places disestablished in 1995